Alexania  is a genus of predatory sea snails, marine prosobranch gastropod mollusks in the family Epitoniidae, commonly known as wentletraps.

Species
According to the World Register of Marine Species, the following species with valid names are included within the genus Alexania :
 Alexania callizona (Habe, 1961)
 Alexania floridana (Pilsbry, 1945)
 Alexania inazawai (Kuroda, 1943)
 Alexania moerchi (A. Adams & Angas, 1864)
 Alexania natalensis (Tomlin, 1926)

References

Epitoniidae